Grant Heslov (born May 15, 1963) is an American actor and filmmaker known for his producing and writing collaborations with George Clooney, which have earned him four Oscar nominations. As a co-producer of Argo (2012), he received the Academy Award for Best Picture in 2013. As an actor, he has appeared in films including True Lies (1994), Black Sheep (1996), Enemy of the State (1998) and The Scorpion King (2002), as well as performing supporting roles in several films made with Clooney.

Personal life
Heslov was born in Los Angeles, California, and was raised in its Palos Verdes area. His father, Arthur Heslov, was a dentist, and his mother, Jerrie (née Rosen), a businesswoman. He has two older brothers, Steven and Michael. Heslov is Jewish.

He attended Palos Verdes High School, then the University of Southern California . He is a member of Phi Kappa Psi.

Heslov is married to Lysa Hayland-Heslov, a producer.

Career
Heslov's acting credits include the films True Lies, Dante's Peak, Enemy of the State, The Scorpion King, Good Night and Good Luck, Congo, Black Sheep, and Catch Me If You Can. He has also appeared in such TV series as Murder, She Wrote, Happy Days, Family Ties, Spencer, Mama's Family, L.A. Law, Matlock, Sleeper Cell and The X-Files.

In August 2006, Heslov and George Clooney started Smokehouse Pictures and began writing screenplays for production. He was nominated for an Academy Award for Best Original Screenplay (with Clooney) and as producer for Best Film for Good Night, and Good Luck. Heslov also appears in the film as Don Hewitt, the director of the TV series See It Now, around which the movie is centered. He directed a screen adaptation of The Men Who Stare at Goats, starring Clooney, Ewan McGregor, Jeff Bridges, and Kevin Spacey and co-produced The American starring Clooney in 2012. He also worked on 2011's The Ides of March. In June 2012, he was invited to join the Academy of Motion Picture Arts and Sciences.

In 2013, Heslov, alongside Clooney and Ben Affleck, won the Academy Award for Best Picture for Argo (2012). The three men also won the Golden Globe Award for Best Motion Picture – Drama and the BAFTA Award for Best Film.

Heslov directed the first and fifth episodes of the 2019 miniseries Catch-22, on which he was also executive producer.

Filmography

References

External links
 
 

1963 births
Living people
Male actors from Los Angeles
American male film actors
American male screenwriters
American male television actors
Film producers from California
Jewish American male actors
People from Palos Verdes, California
Filmmakers who won the Best Film BAFTA Award
Producers who won the Best Picture Academy Award
USC School of Dramatic Arts alumni
Golden Globe Award-winning producers
Best Screenplay AACTA International Award winners
Screenwriters from California
21st-century American Jews